Ransom Williams Dunham (March 21, 1838 – August 19, 1896) was a U.S. Representative from Illinois.

Born in Savoy, Massachusetts, Dunham attended the common schools and the high school in Springfield, engaged as a clerk for a life insurance company 1855–1857. He moved to Chicago in 1857. He became a grain and provision commission merchant. He served as president of the Board of Trade of Chicago in 1882.

Dunham was elected as a Republican to the Forty-eighth, Forty-ninth, and Fiftieth Congresses (March 4, 1883 – March 3, 1889). He retired from active business pursuits. He died in Springfield, Massachusetts on August 19, 1896, while en route to attend the centennial celebration of his native town, Savoy. He was interred in Mount Hope Cemetery in Chicago.

References

1838 births
1896 deaths
Politicians from Chicago
Republican Party members of the United States House of Representatives from Illinois
19th-century American politicians